Orlintsi is a village in Sredets Municipality, in Burgas Province, in southeastern Bulgaria. As of 2007 it had a population of 353.

GERB Hristinka Shopova won the partial local election in 2018 with 159 votes. The village had a high turnout of 80%.

History 
In 2006, robbers broke into the village church stealing a bell, a 1.5m high metal candle and other valuables.

The house of an 81-year-old couple burned down in June 2017. Only a television was saved from the flames.

References

Villages in Burgas Province